The Men's team pursuit at the 2010 Commonwealth Games took place on 6 and 7 October 2010 at the Indira Gandhi Arena.

Qualifying
The two fastest teams advance to the gold medal final. The next two fastest teams advance to the bronze medal final.

Finals
The finals was held on 7 October at 14:15.

References

External links
 Reports

Track cycling at the 2010 Commonwealth Games
Cycling at the Commonwealth Games – Men's team pursuit